Wedge Mountain is a 5,860-foot-elevation (1,786-meter) summit located in Chelan County of Washington state. It is set on the boundary line of the Alpine Lakes Wilderness, on land managed by Okanogan-Wenatchee National Forest. Wedge Mountain is the northeastern terminus of the Stuart Range, which is a subset of the Cascade Range. Precipitation runoff from the mountain drains into tributaries of the Wenatchee River. Backpackers hiking en route to The Enchantments via the Snow Creek Trail traverse the western foot of this mountain. Wedge Mountain is the toponym officially adopted by the U.S. Board on Geographic Names for the 5,860-foot summit.

Peak 6885

Mountain climbers and Fred Beckey in his Cascade Alpine Guide refer to Peak 6885 as Wedge Mountain. It is located two miles south-southwest of the official Wedge Mountain summit along McClellan Ridge, and is also known as "South Wedge Mountain." The east face of this peak has three established climbing routes, two of which were first climbed by Jim Yoder and Pete Austin in 1983, and the third route was done in January 1984 by Jim Yoder and Kevin Buselmeier as a winter ascent.

Climate
Most weather fronts originate in the Pacific Ocean, and travel east toward the Cascade Mountains. As fronts approach, they are forced upward by the peaks of the Cascade Range (Orographic lift), causing them to drop their moisture in the form of rain or snowfall onto the Cascades. As a result, the Cascades experience high precipitation, especially during the winter months in the form of snowfall. During winter months, weather is usually cloudy, but, due to high pressure systems over the Pacific Ocean that intensify during summer months, there is often little or no cloud cover during the summer.

Geology
The Alpine Lakes Wilderness features some of the most rugged topography in the Cascade Range with craggy peaks and ridges, deep glacial valleys, and granite walls spotted with over 700 mountain lakes. Geological events occurring many years ago created the diverse topography and drastic elevation changes over the Cascade Range leading to the various climate differences.

The history of the formation of the Cascade Mountains dates back millions of years ago to the late Eocene Epoch. With the North American Plate overriding the Pacific Plate, episodes of volcanic igneous activity persisted. In addition, small fragments of the oceanic and continental lithosphere called terranes created the North Cascades about 50 million years ago.

During the Pleistocene period dating back over two million years ago, glaciation advancing and retreating repeatedly scoured the landscape leaving deposits of rock debris. The last glacial retreat in the Alpine Lakes area began about 14,000 years ago and was north of the Canada–US border by 10,000 years ago. The "U"-shaped cross section of the river valleys are a result of that recent glaciation. Uplift and faulting in combination with glaciation have been the dominant processes which have created the tall peaks and deep valleys of the Alpine Lakes Wilderness area.

See also

List of peaks of the Alpine Lakes Wilderness
Geology of the Pacific Northwest

Gallery

References

External links
 Weather: Wedge Mountain
 Wedge Mountain (Peak 6885): The Mountaineers

Mountains of Washington (state)
Mountains of Chelan County, Washington
Cascade Range
Wenatchee National Forest
North American 1000 m summits